The Oshawa Group was once a leading owner of supermarkets in Ontario, Canada. It was bought by Sobeys (via Empire Company Limited) in 1998. The company was based in Etobicoke and traded on the Toronto and Montreal stock exchanges.

History
Founded in 1957 as Oshawa Wholesale Limited, the company grew from expansion in the 1960s to 1980s. It was renamed the Oshawa Group Limited in 1971. The company roots date back further to 1914 by founders Max Wolfe (1893–1987) and Maurice Wolfe, who started the Ontario Produce Company and acquired Oshawa Wholesale in 1949 and later gave rise to Oshawa Group.

Notable people
Through the life of the company it was run by the Wolfe family:
 Max and Maurice Wolfe - the Lithuanian Jewish immigrants founded Oshawa Wholesalers in 1957 and Ontario Produce Co. in 1914
 1950s–1976 Ray D. Wolfe, President
 Harvey Wolfe, President
 Raphael Wolfe, President, CEO and Chair
 Jonathan Wolfe, final President and COO

Retail units
Beginning in the 1960s, Oshawa Group acquired various retail chains and stores:
 Dutch Boy
 Dutch Girl
 Towers
 Rite-Way Department Store 1966
 IGA 1964
 Bassin Food chain 1964
 Tradition Market Fresh Food
 Knechtel
 Pharma Plus Drug Stores - acquired in 1988 from Boots Group and once owned by Loblaws operating as Tamblyn Drugs https://en.m.wikipedia.org/wiki/Tamblyn_Drugs; sold to Katz Group of Companies
 Kent Drugs Limited 1968
 Rockower of Canada Limited 1968
 Food City and later as Food Town - converted by Oshawa Group to Price Chopper
 Price Chopper discount supermarket chain, rebranded to FreshCo some time after Oshawa Group was purchased by Sobeys.
 Towers Department Stores 1967 - acquired as Allied Towers Merchants Limited and ceased operations in 1991 with store locations sold to Zellers)
 Consumers Distributing Company Limited - sold 50% stake in 1978
 Coinamatic Laundry Equipment - sold 90% stake in 1978
 acquired Dominion Stores Limited's operations in Nova Scotia and Safeway's stores in Southern Ontario 1985
 acquired Canadian operations of Boots Drug Stores 1988 - changed to Pharma Plus banner

Non-retail units
Outside of retailing, Oshawa Group acquired various companies and real estate:
 Field Fresh Farms (Dairy)
 Dominion Mushroom Company 1963 - sold 1986
Oshawa Group also operated food services company SERCA Foodservices Incorporated.
 Marchland Holdings Limited 1971
 Baxter Estates 1975 - owned and managed apartment in Winnipeg and shopping centre in Calgary; sold 1978
 Systems Construction Limited - modular home builder
 Codville Distributors Limited 1972
 Decarie Square shopping mall in Montreal 1976 - sold 1986

Decline
The retail scene changed in the 1990s, even as the Oshawa Group had begun re-focusing on core operations beginning in the 1980s. The entire operation was sold in 1998 to Sobeys and the Oshawa name disappeared from Canadian retailing.

See also
 Loblaws

References

External links
 Oshawa Group
 Oshawa Group

1957 establishments in Ontario
1998 disestablishments in Ontario
Retail companies established in 1957
Retail companies disestablished in 1998
Defunct companies of Ontario
Defunct supermarkets of Canada
Sobeys
Canadian companies disestablished in 1998
Canadian companies established in 1957